Homoeosoma uncanale is a species of snout moth in the genus Homoeosoma. It was described by George Duryea Hulst in 1886. It is found in North America, including Arizona and California.

Taxonomy
It was previously treated as a synonym of Homoeosoma impressalis.

References

Moths described in 1886
Phycitini